Arth is a 1982 Indian drama film directed by Mahesh Bhatt, starring Shabana Azmi and Kulbhushan Kharbanda in lead roles and Smita Patil, Raj Kiran and Rohini Hattangadi in supporting roles. It features some of the most memorable soundtracks by Ghazal duo, Jagjit Singh and Chitra Singh.

The semi-autobiographical film was written by Mahesh Bhatt about his extramarital relationship with Parveen Babi. It is one of the 25 Must See Bollywood Movies as compiled by Indiatimes Movies. The film was remade in Tamil as Marupadiyum (1993) by Balu Mahendra. In 2017, Pakistani actor and director Shaan Shahid released, Arth 2 and Bhatt acted as a "mentor" during production.

Plot
Pooja, who grew up as an orphan girl and always dreamt of owning a house, becomes insecure when she finds out that she and her husband, Inder, have to leave the apartment they rent. The twist that occurred when Inder gives her the keys of a new house proves to be double-edged, when it is revealed that he is in love with another woman, Kavita, with whom he earned the money (in the film industry) for the new apartment. While previously giving advice to her maid cheated by her husband, now Pooja becomes herself involved in a similar situation. When Inder deserts Pooja for Kavita, she chooses to leave the apartment for a women's hostel with only 2000 that she had when she got married. She is helped by Raj to surpass the difficulties of life as a single person, to find a job and to rely morally on herself. Raj and Pooja become good friends. Gradually, Kavita's mental instability deepens her fears of insecurity, even after Inder requests Pooja to sign the divorce papers.

Raj falls in love with Pooja and proposes to her. She refuses saying she is empty and cannot give him anything. Raj tries to persuade her saying that she cannot spend the rest of her life feeling miserable about the past and that she should try to find a new life for herself. Pooja promises to think about it.

Pooja's maid, whose only aim in life is to secure a good education for her daughter, has saved 1000 towards her admission fees. She finds out that her drunk husband has stolen the money. Furious, she searches for him to find him in the arms of his lover after spending all the money. She kills him and goes to the police station and confesses her crime. Worried about her daughter, she calls Pooja who promises to take care of the daughter.

After the insistence of Kavita's mother and her personal doctor, Pooja personally assures Kavita that she is not interested in Inder any more. However, Pooja's attitude only convinces Kavita that breaking Pooja's marriage was a mistake. To escape from her feeling of guilt and insecurity, she breaks-up with Inder. The latter tries to revive his relation with Pooja, but is rejected.

Pooja continues to live with her maid's daughter and refuses to marry Raj saying that she has found a new meaning to life in being independent and being a mother to the child and marrying Raj will only weaken her.

Cast
Shabana Azmi as Pooja Inder Malhotra
Kulbhushan Kharbanda as Inder Malhotra
Smita Patil as Kavita Sanyal
Raj Kiran as Raj
Rohini Hattangadi as Pooja's maid
Dina Pathak as Kavita's mother
Om Shivpuri as Kavita's doctor
Mazhar Khan as Harish
Gulshan Grover as Gulshan
Dalip Tahil as Dilip
Gita Siddharth as Aparna
Siddharth Kak as Anil
Shammi as Mrs. Bhalla
Chand Usmani as School Administrator
Kiran Vairale as Pooja's Hostel Room-Mate

Soundtrack

Box-office
The film was made on a budget of 1 crore and grossed 2 crore at the Box-office and was declared as "Hit" by the Box-office.

Awards

References

External links
Review at rediff.com
Review at Filmi Geek

1980s Hindi-language films
Films featuring a Best Actress National Award-winning performance
Films about adultery in India
Indian feminist films
Films directed by Mahesh Bhatt
Hindi films remade in other languages
Films whose editor won the Best Film Editing National Award
Hindi-language drama films